Acleris sinuopterana is a species of moth of the family Tortricidae. It is found in China (Xizang).

The wingspan is 17.2–20.9 mm. The forewings range from greyish brown to dark brown. The hindwings are light brown. Adults have been recorded on wing in July.

References

Moths described in 1993
sinuopterana
Moths of Asia